Vann William McElroy (born January 13, 1960 in Birmingham, Alabama), is a former professional American football defensive back who played nine seasons in the National Football League (NFL).

McElroy played in consecutive Pro Bowls following the 1983 and 1984 seasons, and was a member of the Raiders' 1983 team that won Super Bowl XVIII in a rout of the favored Washington Redskins.

During the 1990 season, the Raiders traded McElroy to the Seahawks on October 16 in exchange for the Seahawks' eighth-round pick in the 1991 NFL Draft.

McElroy is currently an agent representing professional players in contract negotiations and resides in Uvalde, Texas.

References

1960 births
Living people
Players of American football from Birmingham, Alabama
American football safeties
Los Angeles Raiders players
Seattle Seahawks players
American Conference Pro Bowl players
Baylor Bears football players
People from Uvalde, Texas